Perversions of Science is an American science fiction/horror anthology television series that ran from June 7 to July 23, 1997, on the premium cable channel HBO, lasting one season. It is a spin-off of the horror series Tales from the Crypt also shown on HBO, and its episodes are based on EC Comics's Weird Science, Weird Fantasy, and Incredible Science Fiction comic book series.

Format
The format of Perversions of Science is similar to Tales from the Crypt; the latter is hosted by the Cryptkeeper, a wisecracking corpse performed by puppeteers, while Perversion of Science is hosted by a computer-generated female robot named Chrome (voiced by Maureen Teefy). Individual episodes begin with an introduction by Chrome, followed by a main narrative. After the narrative is complete, Chrome concludes the episode by making a comment about the story in question. Unlike the Cryptkeeper, who frequently makes puns revolving around death and macabre subjects, Chrome engages more in sexual innuendo.

Most episodes focused on a part of science fiction such as alien invasion or space/time travel.

The show featured a mix of established talent and young up-and-comers. For instance, "Panic" starred a young Jason Lee and Jamie Kennedy opposite of Harvey Korman.

Episodes

Home media
The series was released on March 23, 2001 in Japan (Region 2, NTSC) across three individual DVD volumes by Pioneer Entertainment and Tohokushinsha Film.

References

External links
 
 Perversions of Science on TVShowsOnDVD.com

American horror fiction television series
HBO original programming
1990s American anthology television series
1990s American science fiction television series
1997 American television series debuts
1997 American television series endings
Tales from the Crypt
English-language television shows